Bojan Miovski (born 24 June 1999) is a Macedonian footballer who plays as a forward for Aberdeen and the North Macedonia national team.

Club career
Miovski started his professional career at the age of 18 by making his First Macedonian Football League debut for Bregalnica in 2017. In July 2020 he made his first professional transfer abroad, by signing for Hungarian side MTK Budapest. Two months after joining his club, he also made his league debut in the 4th round of the Nemzeti Bajnokság I by playing 23 minutes in the 0–3 loss to Zalaegerszegi.

On 23 June 2022, Miovski signed a four-year contract with Scottish Premiership side Aberdeen.

On 24 July 2022, Miovski made his debut and scored a goal for Aberdeen against Raith Rovers in a 3–0 victory after taking a penalty kick due to being brought down in the box. In 2023 it was reported that Italian giants Lazio were interested in signing him but the speculation came to nothing.

International career
Miovski made his international debut for North Macedonia U21 on 8 October 2020 in the 2021 UEFA European Under-21 Championship qualification, coming on as a substitute in the 62nd minute against Kazakhstan. The away match finished as a 1–4 win for Macedonia. Previously he also had 2 appearances and one goal for the U19 national team as well.

He made his debut for the North Macedonia national football team on 8 October 2021 in a World Cup qualifier against Liechtenstein.

Career statistics

 25 January 2023

References

External links
 
 

1999 births
Living people
Sportspeople from Štip
Macedonian footballers
North Macedonia youth international footballers
North Macedonia under-21 international footballers
North Macedonia international footballers
Association football forwards
MTK Budapest FC players
Macedonian First Football League players
Nemzeti Bajnokság I players
Macedonian expatriate footballers
Expatriate footballers in Hungary
Macedonian expatriate sportspeople in Hungary
Aberdeen F.C. players
Expatriate footballers in Scotland
Macedonian expatriate sportspeople in Scotland
Scottish Professional Football League players